The Pennsylvania State University Marching Blue Band, known generally as the Blue Band, is the marching band of Pennsylvania State University. Founded in 1899, it is the largest recognized student organization at the University Park campus of Penn State, presently with over 300 active student members. The primary function of the Blue Band is in support of the Penn State Nittany Lions football team, performing for all home football games at Beaver Stadium.

Instrumentation

The current Blue Band numbers 313 members, including 265 instrumentalists, 26 Blue Band Silks (Colorguard), 10 Touch of Blue (majorettes), 2 Uniform Managers, 2 or more Student Operations Assistants, a drum major and a Blue Sapphire (featured baton twirler). Members come from virtually all curricula and colleges represented at the University Park campus of The Pennsylvania State University.

The 2022-2023 Penn State Marching Blue Band includes:

(Needs updating for specific sections)
 Total membership: 316 members
 1 Drum major (Ryan Frist)
 14 Piccolos
 24 Clarinets
 26 Saxophones
 65 Trumpets
 26 Mellophones
 36 Trombones (4 bass trombones)
 20 Baritones
 28 Sousaphones
 32 Percussion
 2 Uniform Managers
 2 Student Operations Assistants
 26 Silks
 10 Majorettes
 1 Feature twirler (Mackenzie Bronk)

History
The Blue Band traces its history to 1899 with the formation of a six-member drum and bugle corps initiated by student George H. Deike.

A donation from steel magnate and Penn State College Board of Trustees member Andrew Carnegie made possible the formation of a brass band in the summer of 1901.

By 1913, the organization was known as the College Band, and the first permanent director of bands, Wilfred O. "Tommy" Thompson, was appointed in 1914.

In 1923, a few new blue uniforms were purchased towards replacement of the old brown military-style uniforms in use. Blue uniforms were issued on the basis of ability and rank. Photos from 1924 (not shown here) show a nucleus of blue-uniformed members in a block "S" formation surrounded by a large number of brown-uniformed band members. This select group of instrumentalists became known as the "Blue Band" and represented Penn State as the official traveling band.

During succeeding eras in which Hummel (Hum) Fishburn (1939–1947), James W. Dunlop (1947–1975), Ned C. Deihl (1975–1996), Dr. O. Richard Bundy (1996–2015) served as directors, the name Penn State Blue Band was kept even though all members were uniformed in blue. Today, the director of the Marching Blue Band is Dr. Gregory Drane.

Auditions
The Blue Band is open to all students at the University Park Campus by competitive audition. The Blue Band accepts 290–315 student members annually. Veteran members (returnees) must re-audition for the band the following year if they wish to return.

The audition process consists of two parts of a standard etude or solo played on the Tuesday (prospective rookies) or Wednesday (prospective returnees) before band camp. The student should pick a slow/lyrical section and a technical/virtuosic section that demonstrates his/her current playing level. The student must then sight read a piece selected by the staff member responsible for their respective section to demonstrate the student's ability to pick up pieces quickly, as there is limited time to prepare the band's repertoire during the season. Staff members score both prepared and sightread performances, which are then tallied and ranked to assist the staff and section leaders in making final cuts.

The music auditions are held in the Spring via video submissions and those who pass this will be invited to band camp where p. rookies are taught the Blue Band style of marching, during which time other members of the Blue Band staff, as well as section leaders make decisions for final cuts which happen that evening. P. Rookie are "Potential Rookies" and if accepted into the band are then considered "Rookies" until they return for a 2nd year where they will be considered "Returnees"

Although the band consists of over 300 players, there are fewer positions in both the pregame and halftime performances.  After all the available slots on the drill are filled, the remaining players (usually rookies) are assigned to double a spot on the field with another Blue Band member (usually another rookie).  These "alternates" are required to learn all the music and drill just as a regular member.  Within each alternate pair, each person is guaranteed one performance between the first two football games.  Afterwards, the whole section competes for spots on the field by memorizing and "checking off" (playing a school song or chaser for a section leader (guide), without music) as many pieces as possible.  If there is a tie or the entire section has all of their music checked off, there are challenges where a player may challenge any one person in the section for a position.  A challenge consists of the playing of Fanfare Downfield Big Ending while marching the "skill drill", which is a basic outline of what each player must do while marching from the beginning of Pregame until the downbeat of Big Ending.

Rehearsal
Membership in the Blue Band requires a large time commitment.  The band practices weekly on Monday, Wednesday, and Friday from 4:00 p.m. (Stretching starts at 3:45) to 5:45 p.m., and on Tuesday from 7:30 p.m. to 10:00 p.m.  The band performs at all home football games and must arrive for an additional Saturday morning rehearsal five hours before the scheduled kickoff.

All practices take place at the O. Richard Bundy Blue Band Building (dedicated in October 2015), the home of the band as of Fall 2004, or on the practice field next to it. A few weeks into the football season, however, Intramural Sports occupy the field on Tuesdays, so the band rehearses on the turf fields next to Holuba Hall, just off of University Drive.

Performances

The Blue Band performs many times throughout the school year, not only during football season. In addition to home football games, the entire band travels to one away game per season, and there is also a small 15-person pep band that travels to the other away games. The band learns a new halftime show for every home game to add a variety of music to the band's repertoire, as well as adding variety to halftime performances.

Saturday performances start by marching over to the Bryce Jordan Center in parade formation to Parade Order. When the band reaches the Bryce Jordan Center, the band plays its Pregame and Halftime music at an event known as Tailgreat, a pre-game pep rally, including performances by the Penn State Cheerleaders and an appearance by the Nittany Lion. After Tailgreat, the band makes its way outside to line up in parade formation to march to the stadium. As is tradition, the band starts its march to Beaver Stadium by singing a rousing rendition of "The Nittany Lion". The band then proceeds to the stadium and prepares for the pregame performance.

When the band is not playing in on the field, it is located within the student section, just behind the South end zone. While in the stands, the band plays a variety of stands tunes and fight songs, including the official fight song of Penn State: "Fight On, State". After the game, the band has a post-game performance on the field, which consists of the traditional playing of "Lion Special", followed by select tunes from their half time performance. There is also a separate performance after the game on the northwest corner of the field known as the "Corner Concert", where the percussion section highlights their parts for halftime, Parade Order, and, more often than not, something entertaining they have come up with during the week.

The band also has many other performances during the year including Men's and Women's Basketball and Volleyball games, and other various sporting events, such as Cross Country meets. Outside of the Blue Band's obligations as a pep band, the band has its own concert, traditionally known as "Band-o-rama", during which the band will reprise the year's halftime music and fight songs.

Class
Although the Blue Band itself is jointly administered by the College of Arts and Architecture and Penn State Intercollegiate Athletics, student members are not paid nor given any scholarship money by the university for being a member of the band. All students who participate in the Blue Band are enrolled in a one-credit class – MUSIC 081 – and must remain a student in good standing with the university in order to maintain their eligibility with the band.

Organization

Director 

Since July 2015, the Band has been led by its sixth director, Dr. Gregory Drane.  According to his staff profile at blueband.psu.edu, Dr. Drane has served as the Assistant Director [of the Blue Band] since 2005, directing Athletic Pep Bands as well as founding the Penn State Volleyball Band, and has been part of the Blue Band staff since 2002, when he was a graduate assistant. A talented saxophone player himself, Dr. Drane has designed and arranged some of the band's most memorable halftime performances, including "Moving Picture Show" and "Game of THONS." Dr. Drane holds a bachelor's degree in music education and music performance from Bethune–Cookman, a master's degree in music education from Penn State and completed his Ph.D. from Penn State in 2019.

Staff

Working with Dr. Drane are two assistant directors, numerous graduate teaching assistants, and instructors. Each assistant director holds a full-time faculty appointment within the Penn State School of Music, while the graduate teaching assistants and instructors vary between paid and volunteer positions.  While utilizing many custom musical arrangements, drill for the Blue Band is typically written by the director and assistant directors, and each section of the band is assigned a graduate assistant or instructor to assist with instruction.

The Assistant Directors of Bands at Penn State University are Robert Hickey and Dr. Ferguson. According to their staff profiles on blueband.psu.edu:

Robert Hickey serves as the Assistant Director of Athletic Bands.  In addition to serving as an Assistant Director of the Blue Band, Mr. Hickey also conducts and directs the Fall Athletic Band and Pride of the Lions Band in the Spring.  Mr. Hickey is an alum of Penn State and the Blue Band with a bachelor's degree in Music Education, and a master's degree in Conducting.

Dr. Ferguson joined the band as a graduate assistant. Before earning her Doctorate she was known as Mrs. Ferguson or "Mickey" however since 2021, she is known as Dr. Ferguson. She has conducted the national anthem, and multiple half time shows, as well as writing her own drill for said shows. Her thesis was on "Oral Histories of Women Instrumentalists in College Marching Bands During the Post-Title IX Era".

The current graduate teaching assistants for the Blue Band are (needs updating for 2022)

Director emeritus 

From 1996 to 2015, the Blue Band was under the direction of O. Richard Bundy. Dr. Bundy received his undergraduate degree in music education from Penn State, then after receiving a master's degree from the University of Michigan, he returned to Penn State for his doctoral degree (serving as assistant director under Dr. Ned C. Deihl from 1983 to 1996). Prior to his appointment to the faculty, he served as trombonist with the United States Continental Army Band and as band director/instrumental music instructor in the Iroquois School District, Erie, Pennsylvania. In addition to conductor of the Blue Band, he teaches courses in conducting, marching band techniques, instrumental music education, and band literature.

Dr. Bundy has the distinction of being the first director of the Blue Band that had previously marched in the band as a member, graduate or undergraduate.

An active guest conductor and adjudicator, Bundy has conducted ensembles and presented clinics throughout the eastern United States and Canada. He is a member of the College Band Directors National Association (CBDNA), Music Educators National Conference, Pennsylvania Music Educators Association, Phi Beta Mu, and Phi Mu Alpha Sinfonia. He is a past president of the Eastern Division of CBDNA and Phi Beta Mu, Nu chapter.

On October 11, 2015, the Blue Band's practice facility was dedicated in Bundy's honor and renamed the O. Richard Bundy Blue Band Building.

Officers
The Blue Band is maintained in a large part by student officers who are elected by the band at the end of the season for the next season.
Officers control uniform assignment, the band finances, the music library, equipment set up and transfer, as well as maintaining the band's website.  Officers also organize intramural sports, ticket raffles, and getting vital information to the section through list serve.

Drum Major
The Penn State Blue Band has one drum major who is chosen in the spring prior to each band camp.  The drum major leads the band through warm-ups and fundamentals as well as instructing the band during rehearsals.  Along with duties in Band Camp and during Football season, the Drum Major also makes various appearances at The Student Bookstore or at other events to get the community a chance to see him/her.  The Penn State Drum Major is perhaps best known for the pre-game flip that was created by Drum Major/gymnast Edwin L. Anderson for the 1942 season. Unfortunately, Anderson had to leave school for the Fall semester due to appendicitis, so the Flip didn't become a tradition until 1971. Currently, the Flip occurs twice under the current Blue Band pre-game drill. Blue Band Drum Majors have been 'flipping' for Penn State since 1971.  In 1978, the flip evolved from a back flip to the current forward flip. The number of drum major flips in the Blue Band pre-game has varied from 1 to 3 (with the current number being 2).

The drum major for the 2019 season was Jack Frisbie. The drum major for the 2020 season was Keith Griffith. The drum major for the 2021 and 2022 season is Ryan Frist.

Guides
The Blue Band's most experienced and most talented members in each section are the guides (section leaders). Guides help the section, especially rookies, learn the Penn State way of doing anything from marching to playing to specifics about each section such as how to hold your instrument, perform special spins (Baritones) or special game-day prep like Sousaphones wrapping their horns. They are most involved with the physical marching ability of the members of their section. Often being asked to stop marching with the band and watch their section perform various marching routines with the purpose of providing feedback to improve their marching. Guides most often carry the traditions, responsibilities, and culture of a section, from parade routines, to special traditions both off and on the field.

Squad leaders
The Band is divided up into about 60 squads, each with a squad leader.  During halftime preparation, the squad leader is responsible for obtaining a copy of the halftime drill and teaching the other members of the squad how to read it, as well as assigning positions in the squad and coaching the squad during practices. Squad leaders are usually guides but in the lack of enough, especially in larger sections, the most experienced member of a squad is the squad leader.

Gameday traditions

Team Walk and President's Tailgate 

Since 2014, the football team arrives outside the baseball stadium, and is led by a parade consisting of a Blue Band pep band, the cheerleaders, dance team and the Nittany Lion, who walk up Curtin Road and then turn into the Stadium amidst the fans who line up along the route.

Another pep band busses out to the Penn State Hotel and Conference Center to play at the President's Tailgate. The Band usually plays a few school songs to rally all those at the President's Tailgate.

Since 2022, the Team Walk and President's Tailgate have combined into a single group simply known as Team Walk. Playing for both the President's tailgate and the Football team arrival at the stadium.

Parade order

This routine occurs during the parade to Beaver Stadium, and the post-game parade from the stadium back to the Blue Band Building. The band marches to the percussion cadence, Parade Order.  Each section of the band has their own set of chants and carefully choreographed motions.  At one point, the trombone section performs "suicides" where the players alternate the positions of their horn between straight up and to the side, trumpets all hold their horns in a line parallel to the ground and do a wave, and the sousaphones do the "tail" in which the back of the band sousas essentially serpentine around each other, giving the band the appearance that it has a lions tail. There are also full band motions such as during the beginning of the parade where the whole band jumps and high kicks with their right foot.  The full band also performs cheers such as "WE ARE PENN STATE!", and "I wish I was in the land of roses" to symbolize any Big Ten band's wish to make it to the Rose Bowl in Pasadena, California.

Parade Order is the feature of the drumline's post-game performance, known as "Corner" or "Drumline Corner", which used to occur in the northwest corner of the stadium, but in recent years is performed on the 50-yard line, after the Blue Band's post-game performance.  Each year, Parade Order is usually modified by one of the members of the drumline, and each week during "Corner" the break features an extended sketch rehearsed by the entire line (previously, a "vocal" featuring a humorous phrase or pop culture reference appeared at this spot). Other features of this performance include calling out the bass line ("Here comes the bass!"), 10 push-ups by the cymbal line, the "White DJ" visual by the snare line and circles by the tenor line.

Parade Order is easily recognized due to its introduction, which features a lick that is similar to the beginning of the SCV cadence, "Electric Wheelchair."

High-step Marching
The Blue Band performs their variation of the "Big Ten March style" during every gameday performance.  In order to high-step march, Blue Band marchers must raise their thigh to be parallel with, extend their calf to be perpendicular to, and point the toe directly at the ground.  This style, in contrast to typical drum-corps style marching, gives the band a very visual effect.  Because the band performs this high-step, it enables them to perform certain moves that could not be done by low stepping.  Penn State's signature pregame move – the 3/4 turn – orients the band to their right after performing a rapid 270-degree turn to the left.

Pregame
The band begins their pregame performance with "Lion Fanfare and Downfield". "Downfield" is when the Drum Major will perform the 2 trademark flips, one on the 50-yard line, and one on the South goal line. Next, the "Star Spangled Banner" is played, followed by the playing of the opponent's fight song when the game is against a Big Ten team. "NFOS" is then played, during which the band creates the "PSU" formation.  From the PSU formation, the "PSU Alma Mater" is played, and the band performs one verse towards each side of the stadium.  The Band finishes up their pregame performance with the Blue Band's "trademark drill," the Floating Lions.  The band spells out the word "LIONS" across the field and reverses the drill halfway through, giving the word "LIONS" a full 180-degree rotation. Lastly, the band moves to the "Team Aisle" formation, from which the Penn State Nittany Lions football team will run out of the tunnel. There are no right turns in pregame.

Big Ten Salute
Every marching band that plays for a Big Ten Conference football team salutes the opposing team's fans during pregame with their fight song.  The Penn State Blue Band inserts the opposing team's fight song into the middle of the pregame performance, and forms the first letter of the name of the opposing team's school while playing their song towards their fans.  This happens immediately after the "Star Spangled Banner" (at a home game) or "Lion Fanfare and Downfield" (at an away game).  In both cases, this is directly before "NFOS" and the PSU formation.

Halftime Shows

2022
September 10th, 2022; University of Ohio vs. PSU: Summer Box Office Hits - Sweet Child of Mine (Thor: Love and Thunder), We Don't Talk About Bruno (Encanto), Top Gun / Danger Zone (Top Gun)

September 24th, 2022; Central Michigan University vs. PSU: Latin Fire - El Toro Caliente, Vivir Mi Vida/ We Are One, Malaguena

October 1st, 2022; Northwestern vs. PSU: Motown - Motown Opener (Get Ready, Dancing in the Street, Stop! In The Name of Love, I Can't Help Myself, Reach Out And I'll Be There), Sir Duke, I Want You Back - Motown Philly

October 22nd, 2022; Minnesota vs. PSU: Generations of Greatness (Featuring Alumni Blue Band) - Fantasmic! Theme Song, Uptight (Everything's Alright), The Nittany Lion (Singing Lion)

October 29th, 2022; Ohio State vs. PSU: Halloween Show - Toccata and Fugue in D minor/The Saw Theme, The Squid Game Theme, Separate Ways (Journey)

November 12th, 2022; Maryland vs. PSU: Military Appreciation (Featuring Mighty Sound of Maryland) - Armed Forces Medley (Semper Paratus, The Army Goes Rolling Along, Anchors Aweigh, Marines' Hymn, The U.S. Air Force), Boogie Woogie Bugle Boy, America the Beautiful

November 26th, 2022; MSU vs. PSU: Motown - Motown Opener (Get Ready, Dancing in the Street, Stop! In The Name of Love, I Can't Help Myself, Reach Out And I'll Be There), Sir Duke, I Want You Back - Motown Philly

2023
September 2nd, 2023; West Virginia University vs. PSU: Salute to West Virginia (Featuring The Pride of West Virginia) - The West Virginia Hills, Circus Farm, Take Me Home, Country Roads

September 9th, 2023; University of Delaware vs. PSU: Disney Show - Fantasmic! Theme Song, We Don't Talk About Bruno (Encanto), It's Wondrous (Wondrous Journeys)

September 16th, 2023; PSU @ University of Illinois: Salute to Pennsylvania (Featuring The Marching Illini) - Pennsylvania, Pennsylvania Polka, Pennsylvania 6-5000, Penn State Victory March

September 23rd, 2023; University of Iowa vs. PSU: Circus Show - Entry of the Gladiators, Sabre Dance, Barnum and Bailey's Favorite

October 14th, 2023; UMass vs. PSU: Classical Fantasia - Symphony No. 5, Dance of the Hours, Pines on the Appian Way

October 28th, 2023; Indiana University vs. PSU: Tribute to International Animation Day - Cartoon Capers (Merrie Melodies Theme, The Pink Panther Theme, Meet the Flintstones, Scooby Doo, Where Are You?), Heroic Cartoon Medley (Wonder Woman Theme Song, Mighty Mouse Theme Song, Underdog Theme Song, Teenage Mutant Ninja Turtles Theme Song), Smile, Darn Ya, Smile! (Warner Bros. Cartoons)

November 11th, 2023; Michigan vs. PSU: A Night at the Oscars - THX Deep Note/MGM Fanfare/Hooray for Hollywood, My Favorite Things (The Sound of Music), E.T. the Extra-Terrestrial Main Theme

November 18th, 2023; Rutgers vs. PSU: Holiday Sing-Along - Jingle Bells, Santa Claus Is Comin' to Town, We Wish You a Merry Christmas

Facts & figures
The Penn State Marching Blue Band has appeared at 33 bowl games including multiple appearances in the Orange, Cotton, Sugar, Fiesta, Gator (now TaxSlayer), Rose and Citrus Bowls. The band has also performed at the Outback, Blockbuster, Holiday, Pinstripe, and Rose Bowls and for the Buffalo Bills on Monday Night Football. In addition to marching in several Orange Bowl, Citrus Bowl, and Fiesta Bowl parades, the Blue Band marched in the Bicentennial Constitution Celebration Parade held in Philadelphia in 1987 and made its first appearance on January 2, 1995, in the Tournament of Roses Parade in Pasadena.

The Blue Band made its film debut in the 1977 made-for-TV movie Something for Joey.  Appearing again in the 1993 feature film Rudy, they played "The Nittany Lion" in the movie.

In 2005, the Penn State Blue Band was honored with the Sudler Trophy. The Trophy, which has been presented by the John Philip Sousa Foundation since 1982, is regarded as the nation's highest accolade for collegiate bands. Dr. Bundy joined previous Blue Band directors and representatives from the Penn State College of Arts and Architecture to accept the award at a halftime presentation during the 2005 homecoming game. In recognition of the honor, members of the Blue Band wore patches commemorating the achievement on their uniforms during the 2005 season.

References

External links
 

Big Ten Conference marching bands
Penn State Nittany Lions football
Pennsylvania State University
Musical groups established in 1899
1899 establishments in Pennsylvania